Acrobasis pyrivorella, the pear fruit moth, pear moth or pear pyralid, is a moth of the  family Pyralidae. It is native to the temperate zone of eastern Asia, where it is widely distributed. It has been recorded from northern China, the Korean Peninsula, Japan, Taiwan and Russia (Primor'ye and Khabarovskii provinces).

The wingspan is 14.5–21.5 mm. Adults are greyish with a violet tinge. The forewings have two transverse stripes with a crescent-shaped dark apical spot in between. The hindwings are yellowish-grey. In Russia, adults are on wing from mid July to mid-August and again in September. The first generation adults bore into the bud and go into hibernation.

The larvae feed on wild and cultivated forms of pears. It either overwinters as first-instar or second-instar larva in the flower buds of pears in a thin white cocoon. In spring the larva moves to a fresh bud and feed in the developing buds, flowers and fruitlets. The larvae may move from fruit to fruit. The larva makes a hole in each fruit and pupate in the fruit, usually at the end of May. The larvae are rose-pink in the first instar, while full-grown larvae are dark-green dorsally and pale-yellow ventrally.

References

Moths described in 1900
Acrobasis
Moths of Asia
Taxa named by Shōnen Matsumura